John Cornelius Butler (July 2, 1887–August 13, 1953) was a Republican politician from New York. He was most notable for his service as a member of the United States House of Representatives from 1941 to 1949 and 1951 to 1953.

Biography
Butler was born in Buffalo, New York on July 2, 1887. He attended the public schools of Buffalo and graduated from Buffalo's Central High School.

Butler worked in businesses on Buffalo's Lake Erie waterfront, primarily as an electrician. He later became active in several unions, including the longshoremen's, grain elevator employees', and electrical workers'.

In 1941, Butler was elected to the U.S. House as a Republican in the special election held to fill the vacancy caused by the death of Pius Schwert. He served from April 22, 1941, until January 3, 1949. He failed to be reelected in 1948. After losing his seat, Butler was employed as sales manager for the Fire Equipment Sales Company and estimator for the Beacon Electrical Engineering and Construction Company, both of Buffalo.

In 1950, Butler was again elected to the U.S. House, and he served from January 3, 1951, to January 3, 1953. Because his district was eliminated after the 1950 census, in 1952 Butler ran in the 42nd District, where he lost the Republican nomination to John R. Pillion. As a member of Congress, Butler was best known for his opposition to the Saint Lawrence Seaway, which he believed would have a detrimental effect on Buffalo's shipping and cargo handling industries.

After leaving Congress, Butler lived in retirement in Buffalo. He died in Buffalo on August 13, 1953. He was buried at Forest Lawn Cemetery in Buffalo.

In 1908, Butler was married to Frances T. Pachowiak (d. 1971). They were the parents of three sons, George, John, and Henry.

References

External links

1887 births
1953 deaths
Republican Party members of the United States House of Representatives from New York (state)
20th-century American politicians
Burials at Forest Lawn Cemetery (Buffalo)